Thomas Pullyson was an English draper and Lord Mayor of London.

He was Sheriff of London in 1574 and then Lord Mayor for 1584, during the reign of Elizabeth I. He applied, unsuccessfully, for the theatres to be closed. He was succeeded by Wolstan Dixie.

See also
List of Lord Mayors of London
List of Sheriffs of London

References

External links
 

Sheriffs of the City of London
16th-century lord mayors of London
Year of birth unknown
Year of death unknown